Continental Gin Company may refer to:

Continental Gin Company (Birmingham, Alabama), listed on the National Register of Historic Places in Jefferson County, Alabama
Continental Gin Company (Dallas, Texas), listed on the National Register of Historic Places in Dallas County, Texas